FK Bregalnica may refer to two football clubs in the Republic of Macedonia:

FK Bregalnica Delčevo
FK Bregalnica Štip